Beth Griffin (born June 14, 1967) is an American politician, teacher, and business person from Michigan. Griffin is a Republican member of Michigan House of Representatives.

Education 
In 1991, Griffin earned a Bachelor of Arts degree in psychology from Indiana-Purdue University at Fort Wayne. In 1996, Griffin earned a MSEd degree in Secondary Education English from Old Dominion University in Norfolk, Virginia.

Career 
In 1999, Griffin became a teacher at Parchment Middle School until 2005. In addition to teaching English, Griffin also taught Special Education to elementary students. As a business person, Griffin is the owner of Premco Finance. In 2010, Griffin became a guest teacher at Mattawan Consolidated Schools.

In 2010, Griffin became the founder and chair person of Mattawan Area Pantry, a nonprofit organization that serves Mattawan School District in Michigan.

In 2012, Griffin became the Vice President of Van Buren County Women's Republican Party.

In 2013, Griffin served as a Commissioner of Van Buren County for two terms until 2016. During Griffin's second term, she was also a Vice Chair person of the Board of Commissioners.

On November 8, 2016, Griffin won the election and became a Republican member of Michigan House of Representatives for District 66. Griffin defeated Democrat Annie Brown with 54.26% of the votes. On November 6, 2018, as an incumbent, Griffin won the election and continued serving District 66. Griffin defeated Dan Seibert with 56.82% of the votes. The 66th House District includes Van Buren County, city of Parchment, Cooper Township, and Alamo Township in Kalamazoo County, Michigan.

Awards 
 2019 Legislator of the Year. Presented by Michigan Manufacturers Association (September 10, 2019).

Personal life 
She has two children. Griffin and her family live in Mattawan, Michigan. For several years, Griffin served as chapter president of ACT! For America, which has been designated as a hate group by the Southern Poverty Law Center.

See also 
 2016 Michigan House of Representatives election
 2018 Michigan House of Representatives election

References

External links 
 Beth Griffin at ballotpedia.org
 Mattawan Area Pantry

1967 births
Indiana University – Purdue University Fort Wayne alumni
Living people
Republican Party members of the Michigan House of Representatives
People from Fort Dodge, Iowa
Old Dominion University alumni
21st-century American politicians
County commissioners in Michigan
Women state legislators in Michigan
21st-century American women politicians